"Hang Tough" is a song by American glam metal band Tesla. The song was released as the second single from the band's second studio album, The Great Radio Controversy. "Hang Tough" peaked at #34 on the Billboard Hot Mainstream Rock Tracks chart.

Music video
The song's music video was directed by Nigel Dick.

The music video begins with a boy playing with an old telegraph, similar to the image on the album's cover art. The rest of the video shows the band performing the song in a darkened room.

Track listing

Charts

Personnel
 Jeff Keith − vocals
 Tommy Skeoch − lead guitar
 Frank Hannon − rhythm guitar
 Brian Wheat − bass
 Troy Luccketta − drums

References

External links
Official Music Video at YouTube

1989 songs
1989 singles
Tesla (band) songs
Geffen Records singles